Maha and MAHA may refer to:

 Maha (name), an Arabic feminine given name
 Maha (film), a Tamil thriller film
 MaHa, Nepali comedy duo, Madan Krishna Shrestha and Hari Bansha Acharya
 Maha Music Festival, an annual music festival held on the riverfront in Omaha, Nebraska
 Microangiopathic hemolytic anemia (MAHA), a microangiopathic subgroup of hemolytic anemia
 Omaha (tribe), also known as Maha tribe
 Mahas, a Nubian tribe of the Sudan
 maha-, a prefix meaning "great" in Pali honorific titles such as Mahathera